Jessica Gadirova (born 3 October 2004) is an English artistic gymnast of Irish birth and Azerbaijani descent, representing Great Britain internationally.   She represented Great Britain at the 2020 Summer Olympics and won a bronze medal in the team event and was part of the silver medal-winning team at the 2022 World Championships.  Individually she is the 2022 World Champion on floor exercise as well as a two-time European champion on the event (2021 and 2022).  Additionally she is the 2022 World and 2021 European all-around bronze medalist and the 2021 European vault silver medalist.

She competed at the 2019 Junior World Championships alongside her twin sister, Jennifer.

Personal life 
Gadirova and her twin sister Jennifer were born in Dublin, Ireland, and are of Azerbaijani descent. Their father, Natig Gadirov, and their mother are from Azerbaijan and emigrated to London in 2001. Gadirova was born in Ireland while her parents worked there for a few months before returning to England. As a result, she has Azeri, Irish and British citizenship. Her paternal grandparents live in Baku: her grandmother is a retired paediatrician, and her grandfather is a professor in physics and mathematics. Gadirova and her sister began gymnastics at six years old because their mother wanted them to have an outlet for their energy.

Gymnastics career

Espoir

2016 
In March Gadirova competed at the British Espoir Championships where she placed 12th in the all-around and sixth on balance beam.

Junior

2018 
In February Gadirova competed at the English Championships where she placed 23rd. The following month she competed at the British Championships where she placed seventh in the all-around, eighth on uneven bars, and sixth on floor exercise.  She ended the season competing at the British Team Championships where she placed 11th in the junior non-squad all-around.

2019 
In March Gadirova competed at the English Championships where she placed fourth behind Ondine Achampong, Halle Hilton, and Jennifer Gadirova.  Later that month she competed at the British Championships where she placed seventh in the all-around, eighth on vault, fourth on uneven bars, and won bronze on floor exercise.  Gadirova next competed at the Flanders International Team Challenge where she finished third in the all-around behind Romanians Ioana Stănciulescu and Silviana Sfiringu and helped Great Britain finish fourth as a team.

In June Gadirova competed at the inaugural Junior World Championships in Győr, Hungary alongside her twin sister Jennifer and Alia Leat. In the team final they finished in sixth place and individually Gadirova finished 33rd in the all-around.

In July Gadirova competed at the Sainté Gym Cup where she helped Great Britain win team gold.  In September she competed at the 2019 Women's British Teams Championships, finishing first in the junior all-around, ahead of her sister.  Additionally she helped Aylesbury finish first as a team.

Senior

2021
Gadirova turned senior in 2020 but did not compete due to the worldwide COVID-19 pandemic. In April 2021 she was selected to represent Great Britain at the European Championships alongside her twin sister Jennifer (later replaced by Phoebe Jakubczyk), Alice Kinsella, and Amelie Morgan.  During qualifications Gadirova qualified to the all-around final despite suffering a hard fall off of the balance beam.  Additionally Gadirova qualified to the vault final in first place and the floor exercise final in third place.  In the all-around final Gadirova won the bronze medal behind Russians Viktoria Listunova and Angelina Melnikova.  She is the second British female artistic gymnast after Ellie Downie to win an all-around medal at the European Championships.  During the vault final Gadirova finished second behind Olympic and World vault medalist Giulia Steingruber.  On the final day of the competition Gadirova won gold on floor exercise ahead of Melnikova and former world all-around champion Vanessa Ferrari, making her the first British floor exercise champion since Beth Tweddle won in 2010.

On 7 June, Gadirova was selected to represent Great Britain at the 2020 Summer Olympics alongside her twin sister Jennifer, Alice Kinsella, and Amelie Morgan.   At the Olympic Games Gadirova qualified to the all-around and floor exercise finals; additionally Great Britain qualified for the team final.  During the team final Gadirova performed on vault, uneven bars, and floor exercise, hitting all of her routines and helping Great Britain win the bronze medal, their first Olympic team medal in 93 years.  During the all-around final Gadirova fell off the balance beam but still finished tenth place overall.  In doing so she became the highest placing British gymnast in an Olympic all-around final, surpassing Becky Downie's 12th-place finish in 2008.  During the floor exercise event final Gadirova performed a clean routine and earned a score of 14.000 and finishing in sixth place.

In December 2021 Gadirova became a brand ambassador for gymnastics leotard manufacturer Milano Pro-Sport.

2022
In March, Gadirova competed at the English Championships where she won the all-around and also took gold on vault and floor.

Later that month, Gadirova competed at the British Championships in Liverpool where she took gold in the all-around with a score of 54.650 ahead of her Aylesbury teammates Ondine Achampong and her sister Jennifer. She then went on to win gold on vault and floor as well as silver on beam.  In July Gadirova was selected to compete at the European Championships alongside her sister Jennifer, Achampong, Georgia-Mae Fenton, and Alice Kinsella.  In August Gadriova competed at the European Championships.  She contributed scores on vault and floor exercise towards Great Britain's second-place finish.  During event finals Gadirova won gold on floor exercise for the second consecutive year. Gadirova was also named Gymnast of the Year 2021 by European Gymnastics alongside Boryana Kaleyn and Ferhat Arıcan.

In September Gadirova was named to the team to compete at the 2022 World Championships, once again alongside her twin sister Jennifer, Achampong, Kinsella, and Fenton.  She helped Great Britain qualify to the team final and individually she qualified to the all-around, vault, and floor exercise finals.  During the team final Gadirova competed on vault, uneven bars, and floor exercise, helping Great Britain win the silver medal and achieve their highest placement at a World Championships.  Additionally Gadirova posted the highest floor exercise score of the competition. During the all-around final Gadirova placed third behind Rebeca Andrade and Shilese Jones, earning Great Britain's first World all-around medal.  Gadirova withdrew from the vault final.  On the last day of competition she competed in the floor exercise final.  She was the last competitor to compete and earned a score 14.200 to win the title.  She became the second British woman to win the floor exercise title after Beth Tweddle did so in 2009.  Gadirova was the second British gymnast to win a gold medal at these World Championships after Giarnni Regini-Moran won the men's floor exercise title the previous day.  At only 18 years and 34 days old, Gadirova became the youngest British gymnast to become a World Champion.  Due to her performances at the World Championships, Gadirova was named Sunday Times Young Sportswoman of the Year  and additionally won the Sports Journalists' Association Peter Wilson Trophy for international newcomer alongside fellow British gymnast Jake Jarman. In December, she won the BBC Young Sports Personality of the Year award.

Selected competitive skills

Competitive history

Awards

References

2004 births
Azerbaijani gymnasts
Irish gymnasts
British female artistic gymnasts
British people of Azerbaijani descent
Irish people of Azerbaijani descent
Living people
Twin sportspeople
European champions in gymnastics
English twins
Irish twins
Gymnasts at the 2020 Summer Olympics
Olympic gymnasts of Great Britain
Olympic medalists in gymnastics
Olympic bronze medallists for Great Britain
Olympic athletes of Great Britain
Medalists at the 2020 Summer Olympics
Medalists at the World Artistic Gymnastics Championships
World champion gymnasts
People from Aylesbury
Sportspeople from Dublin (city)